March 2015

See also

References

 03
March 2015 events in the United States